Washington–Grizzly Stadium is an outdoor college football stadium in the western United States, located on the campus of the University of Montana in Missoula, Montana. Opened  in 1986, it is home to the Montana Grizzlies, a member of the Big Sky Conference in Division I FCS (formerly Division I-AA).

The press box is above the west sideline and lights were added for the 2012 season.

It is the largest all-purpose stadium in the state of Montana, and is the largest on-campus stadium in the Football Championship Subdivision that participates in the playoffs. Yale's massive Yale Bowl is the largest on-campus stadium in the FCS, but Ivy League members abstain from postseason play.

History

Capacity and expansions
The current seating capacity is 25,217 and it has been expanded three times, most recently in 2008 with an upper deck expansion of 2,000 seats on the east side.

The original capacity in 1986 was 12,500 permanent seats on the sidelines with open grass seating behind the end zones, an approximate capacity of 15,000, weather-permitting.  Permanent seating for the end zones was installed in 1995, which brought the seating to 18,845.  Corner seating in the north end zone opened in 2003 and the most recent expansion in 2008 to the east grandstand brought the capacity to 25,217.

A new attendance record was set in 2015 when ESPN and four-time defending national champion North Dakota State opened the FCS season on August 29 and drew 26,472. The previous record was 26,352, set in 2014 against rival Montana State on November 22; both games were Grizzly victories.

Field surface
Infilled SprinTurf was installed in 2001, and replaced in 2008. For its first fifteen seasons, the playing surface was natural grass; with the addition of the artificial turf in 2001, the playing surface was renamed "John Hoyt Field."

After fifteen seasons of SprinTurf, the playing surface was replaced with multi-color FieldTurf in the summer of 2016. Following the installation of FieldTurf in the new softball stadium (Grizzly Field), FieldTurf pitched the university with a new football field and within a month, it was approved by the board of regents and installed.

GrizVision

Previous venues
Before Washington–Grizzly Stadium, the Grizzlies played off-campus at "new" Dornblaser Field from 1968–86. Prior to 1968, Montana played on-campus at "old" Dornblaser Field from 1920–67 (both named for Paul Dornblaser, football captain in 1912, killed in World War I). The old field was at the site of the Mansfield Library.

Prior to 1920, Montana played its home games at a field in downtown Missoula, near the former Missoulian newspaper building.

Largest attendance

Home records

Concerts

See also
 List of NCAA Division I FCS football stadiums

References

External links

 GoGriz.com – about Washington–Grizzly Stadium
 World Stadiums.com – Washington–Grizzly Stadium

College football venues
Montana Grizzlies football
American football venues in Montana
Sports venues in Missoula, Montana
Buildings and facilities of the University of Montana
1986 establishments in Montana
Sports venues completed in 1986
University and college buildings completed in 1986